Shuangta (双塔区) is a district of Chaoyang, Liaoning, People's Republic of China (PRC).

Shuāngtǎ (双塔) may also refer to the following locations in the PRC:

 Shuangta, Jize County, town in Hebei
 Shuangta, Pulandian, town in Liaoning
 Shuangta Township, Gansu, in Guazhou County
 Shuangta Township, Henan, in Minquan County
 Shuangta Subdistrict, Zhuozhou, Hebei
 Shuangta Subdistrict, Suzhou, in Gusu District (formerly Canglang District), Suzhou, Jiangsu
 Shuangta Subdistrict, Jiangshan, Zhejiang